Lichterfelde may refer to:

 Lichterfelde (Berlin), a locality in the borough of Steglitz-Zehlendorf in Berlin, Germany
 Lichterfelde West, an elegant residential area in Berlin
 Lichterfelde, Saxony-Anhalt, a municipality in the Stendhal District, Germany
 Lichterfelde, a village within the Schorfheide municipality in Brandenburg, Germany
 VfB Lichterfelde, a defunct football club from the Lichterfelde  district of Berlin